Allan Zavod  (16 October 1945 – 29 November 2016) was an Australian pianist, composer, jazz musician and occasional conductor whose career was mainly in America.

Zavod completed a music degree from the Melbourne Conservatorium, University of Melbourne in 1969. His talent as a pianist was recognised by Duke Ellington, who arranged for him to study at the Berklee College of Music, Boston – where Zavod was later a professor of music.

Zavod was based in the US for 20 years, where he played, toured and recorded. He scored more than 30 American and Australian films and television shows. His symphonic works have been performed by orchestras in Australia, Europe and the U.S. He composed the Environmental Symphony for orchestra, narrator and synchronized visuals which was performed at the 2010 Banksia Environmental Awards and narrated by Sir Richard Branson.

The University of Melbourne awarded Zavod the Degree of Doctor of Music in recognition of his international achievements as a composer.

Biography

Zavod was classically trained at University of Melbourne Conservatorium after being awarded the prestigious full Ormond scholarship. In the late 1960s he was discovered by Duke Ellington, who arranged for him to further his jazz studies at famed Berklee College of Music, Boston, where Zavod taught.

He spent the following 30 years in the US performing. He performed before the Queen and years later Prince Charles and Princess Diana, and recently Prince and Princess Norodom of Cambodia, heads of country and state, foreign dignitaries, government bodies, universities and charitable organizations in many countries. Zavod was also a studio musician with such artist as Jean Luc-Ponty, toured in Frank Zappa's band in 1984, and provided studio work on Zappa's release "Guitar".

As a film composer he wrote scores for more than 40 films, documentaries, television and theatre, including: 
 Six Concertos: (for Piano, Trumpet, Trombone, Violin, Guitar, Oboe)
 Concertato for Orchestra: Works for Choir, Brass Band, Classical and Jazz Ensembles
 The International Red Cross, celebrating the centennial of the first Nobel Peace Prize, United Nations Geneva Switzerland featuring Australian violinist Rupert Guenther
 Work for The Olympic Games I.O.C. Performance and recording Sydney, Australia
 Hurricane Katrina commemoration, New Orleans, Louisiana
 Australian archive of Jewish Music
 Bi Centennial Australia Day celebrations Televised Nationally Opera House Sydney.
 Orchestrations of Traditional Folk songs for Vietnamese National Symphony Orchestra, Hanoi, Vietnam
 2015 Anzac Gallipoli commemoration Zavod performed on board ship at a dawn service in Anzac Cove Gallipoli with New Zealand Opera Singer Dame Malvina Major: ‘Australia Remembers’ WW11 Gala tribute (arrangements) 
 5-movement symphony ‘The Environmental Symphony for Orchestra, Narrator and Synchronized Visuals.’ Narration written by Scientist Dr Alan Finkel Chancellor of Monash University and narrated by Sir Richard Branson.

Awards 
In 2009, he was awarded the Doctor of Music Degree by the University of Melbourne. Being one of only five recipients of an earned doctorate in composition over the history of the university, this higher doctorate is awarded to scholars who have “made an international contribution to music knowledge.”

Original compositions performed
 2015 Flurry A work for violin, clarinet and piano
 2015 Good Vibrations Concertato for Orchestra Queensland Youth Orchestra Conductor John Curro AM MBE World Premiere Q.PAC Concert Hall Qld. Aus.
 2011 Concerto for Oboe soloist Diana Doherty, Queensland Youth Symphony conductor John Curro AM MBE. World Premiere QPAC Qld.
 2010 Urban Concerto for Guitar, Jazz Ensemble and Orchestra soloist Slava Grigoryan with SBS Television and Radio Youth Orchestra. World premiere, Sydney Aus.
 2010 Environmental Symphony for Orchestra and Narrator to be performed Oct 15 at The Banksia Awards, Sydney, Narrator Sir Richard Branson Narrative written by Dr Alan Finkel AM World premier, Sydney.
 2010 The Super Jam Sessions- Nigel Kennedy violin, Zavod keyboards Abbotsford Convent Melb, Basement, Sydney.
 2008 Australian Concert Trio on tour with “Sting” Zavod piano, David Berlin cello, Slava Grigoryan guitar Sydney Opera House. Melb. Concert Hall. Festival Theatre Perth. Adelaide, Australia. 
 2006 Force D’Esprit commissioned and performed by Louisiana Philharmonic Orchestra conductor Klauspeter Seibel. World premiere New Orleans US.
 2003 Concerto for Jazz Trombone soloist James Morrison with the Munich Radio Orchestra conductor Gavin Sutherland. World premiere Munich, Germany.
 2003 Concerto for Trumpet, Jazz Trio and Orchestra soloist James Morrison with the Munich Radio Orchestra, conductor Gavin Sutherland- Munich, Germany.
 2001 Concerto for Trumpet, Jazz Trio and Orchestra soloist James Morrison with the Sydney Symphony Orchestra. Opera House Sydney Aus.
 2000 Olympic Rhapsody Zavod solo piano: composed and performed for I.O.C. Sydney Olympics
 2000 Youth Suite for Classical Orchestra and Jazz Ensembles Wesley College, Melbourne
 2000-1985... Thirty US and Australian film scores including a movie with celebrated guitarist Eric Clapton, A Disney film and an award-winning Australian children's film for "Shines" director Scott Hicks.
 1996 The Hobbit scored for Australian live theatre nationally (Polyglot Theatre Company) Recording.
 1995 Concerto for Trumpet, Jazz Trio and Orchestra soloist James Morrison with the Adelaide Symphony Orch. World Premiere Adelaide Concert Hall.
 1989 Le Promenade for Symphonic Band Melbourne Youth Symphonic Band (Melbourne Youth Music Council).
 1988 Concerto Australiana A Piano Concerto for Jazz Trio and Orchestra. (Australia Council commission) Performed on Australia Day, Australian Bicentennial at the Sydney Opera House. Soloist/composer Allan Zavod with Australian Youth Orchestra- live national broadcast ABC TV. Released in association with ABC for audio recording and televised broadcast-World premiere
 1988 Rockin Along Commissioned by and for the Australian Girls Choir. 
 1987 Winner Asia-Pacific Broadcasting Union Song Contest held in Kuala Lumpur, representing Australia sponsored by SBS Song Composer and music director.

Educator

 Speaker Composition Seminar Monash University for Dr Thomas Reiner. 
 Monash University  Mannix Fellow and speaker Mannix College Fellowship Lecture.
 Tutor for Composition courses years 1-3 Victorian College of the Arts. Guest juror Victorian College of the Arts.
 Twice speaker for “Careers In Music”(Melbourne University). 
 Artist in Residence Melbourne University
 Devised and taught an elective on Classical/Jazz Fusion in Composition and Performance. 
 Twice Artist in Residence Wesley College Melbourne-
 Devised and taught courses in jazz improvisation. 
 Composed and conducted a large orchestral work for Wesley College incorporating Symphonic Band, String Ensemble, Big Band and members of the Choir.
 Melbourne Youth Music Camp as head of the Jazz Choir-visited in 1988 by HRH. Prince of Wales and Princess Diana.
 Australian Musician Magazine writer -music lessons-15 years. 
 Speaker Stonnington Council Mentors Program (Melbourne). 
 Challenging youth through orchestral works in the classical/jazz genre.(e.g. Australian Youth Orchestra, SBS Youth Television and Radio Orchestra, Queensland Youth Symphony).

International and national tours

 2015 Europe Tour. Solo and trio 
 2014 Asia Tour Vietnam, Cambodia Hong Kong
 2008 Aus Concert trio ZBG Australian ‘Sting’ Tour
 2004 Hardbite Northern European tour 
 1973–1990s Allan Zavod Trio Australia wide
 1974-1986 Frank Zappa, Jean-Luc Ponty, Woody Herman, Maynard Ferguson, Glenn Miller Orchestra

Discography as primary and associate artist, and/or composer

 Concerto for Trumpet, Jazz Trio and Orchestra (broadcast ABC)
 Concerto for Jazz Trombone (broadcast Munich)
 Urban Concerto for Guitar and Orchestra (broadcast SBS)
 Concerto for Oboe  and Orchestra Resilient Spirit - Oboe Soloist Dianna Doherty (DVD jvd video prod) 
 Environmental symphony for Orchestra, Narrator and synchronised visuals (Five movement)Narration Dr Alan Finkel Narrator Sir Richard Branson (rec)
 Concertato for Orchestra  Good Vibrations (ABC Recording )(DVD)
 A work for Violin, Clarinet and Piano – Flurry(ABC Recording) Plexus Trio
 Force D'Esprit (broadcast Louisiana)
 What's New (Larrikin Records)
 Death of a Soldier- film soundtrack (Avante-Guard Records)
 The Hobbit -soundtrack (Zav Music/Fantasy Records)
 Classic Hymns Vol 1, Vol 11 (Brunson Brother Recordings)
 More Great Australian Film and TV Themes (ABC Records)
 w/Frank Zappa: Does Humor Belong in Music?, You Can't Do That on Stage Anymore, Vol. 1, 3, 4 and 6, Guitar (Barking Pumpkin Records and Rykodisc)
 w/Maynard Ferguson “Chameleon” (Columbia)
 w/Jean-Luc Ponty: Jean-Luc Ponty Live, A Taste for Passion, Cosmic Messenger, Enigmatic Ocean, Imaginary Voyage (Atlantic Records)
 New York Mary (Geffen Records)
 Zavod, Berlin, Grigoryan “The Australian Concert Trio” (ZBG Records)
 Ballade For Annia  (Move Records) 
 Live at BMW Edge “So Many Notes” (Jewish Museum of Australia/Gandel Centre of Judaica)
 w/Billy Cobham-John Scofield “Life and Times” WEA 
 w/Gary Burton-Mike Gibbs  “In the Public Interest” Polydor Records
 Olympic Rhapsody (Zav Records)
 Humanity United (Zav Records), with Rupert Guenther (violin)
 The Anthony I. Ginnane Collection (1M1 Records)
 w/Australian Crawl “Between A Rock and a Hard Place” (EMI)
 w/Maurie Fields “Cheers”, “All The Best”, “Music of a Lifetime” (Virgin and CEL)
 Lil Elvis  (ABC Records)
 Australia Land of Today (Polygram)

Selected 20th-century work

 1972 American Tour with Glenn Miller Orchestra under Buddy De Franco
 1974 World Tour and recording with the Maynard Ferguson Big Band - "Chameleon" Available on Columbia
 1976 Recorded with the Billy Cobham Band, "Life and Times" Available on C.B.S
 1980 A.B.C Showband – Music Arranger
 1984 World Tours with Frank Zappa, including Live Video and Recording "Does Humour Belong in Music" produced by Frank Zappa, "Frank Zappa Guitar" Disc 1 and 2 Ryko Disc, US and "You Can’t Do That On Stage" 1-6 Barking Pumpkin Records, US
 1985 Guest Recording Artist with "Australian Crawl"
 1988 Winner W.R.O.K. Australian Bicentennial Songwriters Award
 1992 "All the Best" Maurie Fields – Virgin Records, (Producer)
 1992 "Cheers" Maurie Fields – Virgin Records, (Producer)
 1989 Winner Australian Writers and Art Directors Award
 1992 Conductor Judith Durham, M.C.G – Final World Cup Cricket
 1993 "Let me Find Love" Judith Durham (Co-Producer, music director, Arranger)
 1993 "Australia Land of Today" Judith Durham (Producer, music director, Arranger)
 1993 A.B.C Soundtrack C.D "More Great Australia Film and TV Themes" (Right hand Man Theme)
 1993 – 1995 Judge, Australian Film Institute Awards for Music
 1996 "Maurie Fields – Music of a Lifetime" CEL Records (Producer)
 1996 "Lil Elvis" Australian Children's Television Foundation (Songwriter)
 1997 Began Australian Musician magazine Music Educator.
 1997 Featured in Oxford Companion to Australian Music
 1999 JRR Tolkien "The Hobbit" Australia wide Theatre production
 2000 Australian composers Guild Award (Sandy Dennis), Government House Sydney
 1999-2001 Special guest lecturer Melbourne University "Careers in Music".
 2000 "Olympic Rhapsody 2000" CD – IOC Performance Olympic Games Sydney
 2001 Stonnington Council "Mentor program" guest speaker

References

1945 births
2016 deaths
People educated at Brighton Grammar School
Australian male composers
Australian composers
Australian jazz pianists
Musicians from Melbourne
Recipients of the Medal of the Order of Australia
Male pianists
Male jazz musicians
Australian film score composers